Neve Michael (lit. Michael's Haven) also known as Roglit, is a moshav in central Israel. Located in the Adullam region and built upon an eminence in the far south-east end of the Elah Valley, it falls under the jurisdiction of Mateh Yehuda Regional Council.

History
The village was established on 29 July 1958 (12 Av 5718 anno mundi) by Kurdish immigrants from Iran on farm land that had belonged to the depopulated Palestinian village of Bayt Nattif. The place had formerly been known as Khirbet Jurfah, where archaeological finds ranged from the early Hellenistic period to the Umayyad period with evidence of a Jewish settlement in the first century CE. The newly restructured Jewish National Fund (JNF), working in concert with the Hitahdut HaIkarim agricultural organisation, settled new immigrants on the site in 1958, giving to the place the name Roglit, meaning "tiller [of the grapevine]". The new immigrants were initially employed as laborers for JNF land reclamation. Afterwards, the village economy was based on agriculture (citrus fruit) and poultry, which phased out in the late 1980s. A newer regional community center built alongside it was given the name Neve Michael, in memory of American philanthropist, Michael M. Weiss, who was a donor to the JNF.

The newer section had a regional elementary school which catered to children from the surrounding communities of Roglit, Aderet and Aviezer, but closed its doors in the early 1980s. Today, the grounds of the old school serve as a home for the mentally and physically disabled. When the new settlement of Neve Michael failed to attract new residents, the settlement of Neve Michael was merged with Roglit in 1983.

A new Israel Border Police outpost was also built in Neve Michael, which was later abandoned in 1962. The founders were joined by immigrants from North Africa, mainly Morocco. In 2005 the village started an expansion plan attracting many younger families to the moshav.  The moshav has a mixed population with people of different ages, ethnic background and Jewish religious observance.

Within relatively short driving distances from the moshav are the ruins known as Adullam and Hurvat Itri.

Gallery

References

External links
 Rogelit in Antiquity Archaeological Survey of Israel

Iranian-Jewish culture in Israel
Kurdish-Jewish culture in Israel
Hitahdut HaIkarim
Moshavim
Populated places established in 1958
1958 establishments in Israel
Populated places in Jerusalem District
Valley of Elah